Schoolhouse Rock! is an American interstitial programming series of animated musical educational short films (and later, music videos) that aired during the Saturday morning children's programming block on the U.S. television network ABC. The themes covered included grammar, science, economics, history, mathematics, and civics. The series' original run lasted from 1973 to 1984; it was later revived from 1993 to 1996. Additional episodes were produced in 2009 for direct-to-video release.

History

Development
The series was the idea of David McCall, an advertising executive of McCaffrey and McCall, who noticed his young son was struggling with learning multiplication tables, despite being able to memorize the lyrics of many Rolling Stones songs. McCall hired musician Bob Dorough to write a song that would teach multiplication, which became "Three Is a Magic Number." Tom Yohe, an illustrator at McCaffrey and McCall, heard the song and created visuals to accompany it. Radford Stone, producer and writer at ABC, suggested they pitch it as a television series, which caught the attention of (future chairman and CEO of The Walt Disney Company) Michael Eisner, then vice president of ABC, and of cartoon director Chuck Jones.

Original series

The first video of the series, "Three Is a Magic Number," originally debuted during the debut episode of Curiosity Shop on September 2, 1971. The Curiosity Shop version is an extended cut which includes an additional scene/verse that explains the pattern of each set of ten containing three multiples of three, animated in the form of a carnival shooting game. This scene has never been rebroadcast on ABC, nor has it been included in any home media releases.

Schoolhouse Rock! debuted as a series in January 1973 with Multiplication Rock, a collection of animated music videos adapting the multiplication tables to songs written by Bob Dorough. Dorough also performed most of the songs, with Grady Tate performing two and Blossom Dearie performing one during this season. General Foods was the series' first sponsor; later sponsors of the Schoolhouse Rock! segments also included Nabisco, Kenner Toys, Kellogg's, and McDonald's. During the early 1970s, Schoolhouse Rock was one of several short-form animated educational shorts that aired on ABC's children's lineup; others included Time for Timer and The Bod Squad. Of the three, Schoolhouse Rock was the longest-running.

George Newall and Tom Yohe were the executive producers and creative directors of every episode, along with Bob Dorough as musical director. This first season was followed in short order by a second season, run from 1973 to 1975, entitled Grammar Rock, which included nouns, verbs, adjectives, and other parts of speech (such as conjunctions, explained in "Conjunction Junction"). For this second season, the show added the services of Jack Sheldon, a member of The Merv Griffin Show house band, as well as Lynn Ahrens; both of them contributed to the series through the rest of its run. Blossom Dearie returned for a second episode, and Essra Mohawk joined the cast as a recurring singer.

To coincide with the upcoming United States bicentennial, a third season, America Rock, airing in 1975 and 1976, had music videos covering the structure of the United States government (such as "I'm Just a Bill") along with important moments in American history (examples include "The Preamble" and "Mother Necessity").

A fourth series, titled "Science Rock," followed in 1978 and 1979, and included a broad range of science-related topics. The first video of this season, "A Victim of Gravity," parodied elements of the hit film Grease and featured a rare guest appearance from a pop band, with recently reunited doo-wop group The Tokens providing the vocals. In addition to episodes describing the human body's anatomical systems (the nervous, circulatory, skeletal and digestive systems each received a music video), episodes describing physical sciences such as astronomy, meteorology and electricity were also included, as was "The Energy Blues," an environmentalism-themed video.

A fifth follow-up series, titled "Scooter Computer and Mr. Chips," featuring the titular characters (the only music videos in the series to feature any recurring characters), premiered in the early 1980s and comprised just four segments about home computer technology, then just emerging onto the scene. As the references and depictions became quickly outdated, due to the rapid advance of technology, these segments stopped airing after 1985 and were not released on home video until the 30th anniversary DVD in 2002.

1990s

After leaving the airwaves in 1985, the original team reunited to produce two more Grammar Rock segments ("Busy Prepositions" and "The Tale of Mr. Morton") for television in 1993 with J. J. Sedelmaier Productions, Inc. of White Plains, New York. This was followed in 1995 by a new series, "Money Rock," which discussed themes related to money management on both the personal and governmental scale. The first cartoon (also a J. J. Sedelmaier Production, Inc. production) was "Dollars & Sense." Episodes from the new series aired in rotation with the original segments from 1993 to 1996.

The Walt Disney Company acquired Schoolhouse Rock in 1996 along with its acquisition of ABC owner Capital Cities/ABC Inc.; Schoolhouse Rock was one of only two children's shows (The Bugs Bunny and Tweety Show being the other) to continue airing (albeit in reruns) after the transition to One Saturday Morning The series as a whole (after 27 years, shortly before the show's 30th anniversary) ceased airing on television in 2000, with newer episodes being released directly to home video. However, reruns occasionally aired on Toon Disney's Big Movie Show block in 2004, but were soon removed from the schedule.

21st century
Starting in 2002, the team once again reunited to produce a new song "I'm Gonna Send Your Vote to College," written by George Newall and performed by Bob Dorough and Jack Sheldon for the 30th Anniversary VHS and DVD releases. For the new song, Tom Yohe Jr. took over as lead designer for his father, Tom Yohe Sr., who had died in 2000. Another contemporary song, called "Presidential Minute," also written by George Newall which explained the process of electing the President of the United States in greater detail, was included on the 2008 DVD Schoolhouse Rock! Election Collection, which centered on songs relating to American history and government.

As the theory of climate change was put forth, a new series entitled "Schoolhouse Rock Earth" was created by the original production team, premiered in 2009, and featured 11 environmentally-themed songs.

On January 6, 2013, George Newall and Bob Dorough appeared at the Kennedy Center in Washington, D.C., as part of their ongoing series of free concerts on the Millennium Stage. It was deemed the largest attendance to date of the venue. Dorough played five songs, accompanying himself on the piano: "Three Is a Magic Number," "Figure Eight," "Conjunction Junction," "Preamble," and "I'm Just a Bill."  (Dorough had only performed lead vocals on the original version of "Three Is a Magic Number.") He also performed "Interjections!" accompanied by DC-area kids' band Rocknoceros. Rocknoceros also performed "Electricity, Electricity," "Unpack Your Adjectives," "Energy Blues," and "Fireworks."

On March 20, 2019, it was announced that Schoolhouse Rock!: The Box Set (1996) was added to the Library of Congress National Recording Registry in its 2018 class.

Music videos

Multiplication Rock

No shows were produced featuring the number 1 explicitly, though several of them, including "Elementary, My Dear," do include this number. "My Hero, Zero" introduced the subject of how to use zero for multiplying by 10, 100, and 1,000. "Little Twelvetoes" introduced the subject of how math arranged on base 12 rather than on base 10 would work, as well as covering multiplication by 12.

In 1973, Capitol Records released a soundtrack album of Multiplication Rock (SJA-11174), featuring all 11 songs. Two tracks, "My Hero, Zero" and "Three Is a Magic Number", had been edited for TV to keep each video within three minutes. This LP features both songs in their full, uncut forms. Also, the album version of "The Four-Legged Zoo" has an ending slightly different from the television version.  Released with the album was a single (Capitol 3693) with the two Grady Tate–sung tracks ("Naughty Number Nine" b/w "I Got Six"). This album was re-released on red/blue-colored vinyl on Record Store Day 2019.

Grammar Rock

This segment introduces Jack Sheldon and Lynn Ahrens as series regulars. "Conjunction Junction" and "A Noun Is a Person, Place, or Thing" were Sheldon and Ahrens' debuts on Schoolhouse Rock! respectively.

"Busy Prepositions" (a.k.a. "Busy P's") and "The Tale of Mr. Morton" were produced for Schoolhouse Rock!s return to ABC in 1993 with J.J. Sedelmaier Productions, Inc. producing the animation.

America Rock

"I'm Gonna Send Your Vote to College" and "Presidential Minute" were produced for DVD.

Science Rock

 In the Disney+ version of "Electricity, Electricity," the flashing light visuals for the "electricity" text are toned down to reduce the risk of anyone with photosensitive epilepsy.
 Sometime after its initial airing, "The Greatest Show on Earth," also known as "The Weather Show," was pulled from broadcast rotation because the Ringling Bros. and Barnum & Bailey Circus objected to its use of their trademark slogan (which was in the questioned title) and filed a lawsuit against the network for copyright infringement. As a result, the 1995 VHS of the program (and subsequent VHS reissues) deleted the song. However, it was included in the 1987 Schoolhouse Rock! VHS release, and in 2002 it was included on the bonus disc of the Special 30th Anniversary Edition DVD (see below).

Computer Rock

Money Rock

Earth Rock

These songs did not air on ABC. They premiered on a DVD released in 2009. They were also available for purchase on iTunes.

Tie-ins
Several tie-ins were released in 1995:
 Schoolhouse Rock! Rocks, a tribute album featuring covers of Schoolhouse Rocks songs performed by popular music artists (see below)
 Schoolhouse Rock! The Official Guide, written by Tom Yohe and George Newall, and including synopses, lyrics, and production notes about each of the shorts created to date, except "The Weather Show," which was the subject of pending litigation and so could not be included. "The Weather Show" was shown with all the other Science Rock episodes in 1979. The book was updated in 2023 to coincide with the 50th anniversary of the show, with songs added from Money Rock.
 The Schoolhouse Rock Songbook (Cherry Lane Music), containing sheet music for 10 songs.
 Schoolhouse Rock! Soundtrack The 4-CD release with bonus tracks on each CD was released on June 18, 1996, by Rhino Records.

The Best of Schoolhouse Rock was released in 1998 jointly by American Broadcasting Companies, Inc. and Rhino Records.

Home video
A 1987 production of the series for VHS tape released by Golden Book Video featured Cloris Leachman opening the collection and some songs with child dancers and singers. Three songs (namely "Three Ring Government," "The Good Eleven," and "Little Twelve Toes") were not included on the videos.

In 1995, ABC Video and Image Entertainment released two volumes of Schoolhouse Rock! on LaserDisc, Schoolhouse Rock! Volume 1: Multiplication Rock and Grammar Rock (ID3245CC), and Schoolhouse Rock! Volume 2: America Rock and Science Rock (ID3383CC). For both volumes, the first side was in the CLV Extended Play format and the second was in the frame-accessible CAV format, and both contained CX-encoded analog and digital audio soundtracks. The "Grammar Rock" volume included the 1993 shorts "Busy Prepositions" and "The Tale of Mr. Morton."

In 1994, ABC/King Features sold exclusive licensing rights for apparel to Coastal Concepts, Inc. of Vista California, the first company to produce Schoolhouse Rock! apparel. Tom Yohe worked with contemporary artist Skya Nelson to create over 50 new designs and update the Schoolhouse Rock! image for a new market, which sold $1.1 million in its first year and exploded selling over $12 million the next year. A variety of bands working with Rhino Records were furnished with newly minted Schoolhouse Rock! T-shirts for the music videos youth market. The licensing rights were expanded to include other manufacturers in 1996.

In 1995, ABC teamed with Paramount Home Video and re-released four segments of Schoolhouse Rock! on VHS with alternative covers and opening.

In 1997–1998, for the show's 25th anniversary, Walt Disney Home Video, which became a sister company to ABC after their purchase in 1996, released five segments on VHS, along with "Money Rock" being released in 1998.

On August 27, 2002, Walt Disney Home Entertainment released a 2-DVD set to coincide with the 30th anniversary of the show. The set features 52 of the 53 episodes that had been produced up to that point, including three of the lost "Computer Rock" segments, with the exception of "Introduction." "The Weather Show" and "Presidential Minute" are found on the bonus disc, the former in modified form with the problematic lyric removed, and the latter viewable only upon completing the "Earn Your Diploma" Trivia Game. An abbreviated VHS, featuring 25 episodes (ranked on the tape in order of popularity) and "I'm Gonna Send Your Vote to College," was released at the same time.

In 2008, DVDs of the individual Schoolhouse Rock! series were released for classroom use.

On September 23, 2008, Schoolhouse Rock! Election Collection was released, including 14 songs about American history and the government and a "new to DVD" song.

On March 31, 2009, Walt Disney Studios Home Entertainment released Schoolhouse Rock! Earth, including 11 newly written and animated songs, as well as "Energy Blues.”

On June 5, 2020, a majority of the shorts were made available for streaming on Disney+, with a disclaimer stating the shorts contain "outdated cultural depictions.”

Tribute albums 

In 1996, the album Schoolhouse Rock! Rocks was released by Rhino Records, with fifteen covers of Schoolhouse Rock songs including the theme. Covers by notable artists included "Three is a Magic Number" by Blind Melon, "No More Kings" by Pavement, "The Shot Heard 'Round the World" by Ween, "My Hero, Zero" by The Lemonheads and "Verb: That's What's Happening" by Moby.

On August 18, 1998, Rhino also released Schoolhouse Rocks the Vote!: A Benefit for Rock the Vote, a tribute album containing covers and original songs in the style of Schoolhouse Rock!, all with an electoral theme. It was released as a fundraiser for Rock the Vote, an organization advocating for political awareness and voting among young people. Several well-known artists contributed tracks to the album, including Isaac Hayes, Joan Osborne, The Sugarhill Gang and The Roots, alongside original Schoolhouse Rock! performers Bob Dorough, Essra Mohawk and Grady Tate.

Schoolhouse Rock Live!

A musical theatre adaptation of the show, titled Schoolhouse Rock Live!, premiered in 1993.  It featured a collaboration between artists Scott Ferguson, Kyle Hall, George Keating, Lynn Ahrens, Bob Dorough, Dave Frishberg, and Kathy Mandry, utilizing some of the most famous songs of Newall and Yohe.

A follow-up production entitled Schoolhouse Rock Live, Too, written by the same team as Schoolhouse Rock Live!, premiered in Chicago in 2000.

50th Anniversary Singalong
A musical television special celebrating 50 years of Schoolhouse Rock! titled Schoolhouse Rock! 50th Anniversary Singalong aired on February 1, 2023.

See also
 Look and Read (songs)
 The Metric Marvels

References

External links

 
 
 Schoolhouse Rock! Live

 
1970s American animated television series
1973 American television series debuts
1980s American animated television series
1990s American animated television series
2000s American animated television series
2009 American television series endings
American Broadcasting Company original programming
American children's animated comedy television series
American children's animated education television series
American children's animated musical television series
American television series revived after cancellation
Emmy Award-winning programs
English-language television shows
Interstitial television shows
Television series by Disney–ABC Domestic Television